Spathodus is a small genus of cichlids endemis to Lake Tanganyika in east Africa.

Species
There are currently two recognized species in this genus:
 Spathodus erythrodon Boulenger, 1900  
 Spathodus marlieri Poll, 1950

References

 
Eretmodini
Freshwater fish genera

Cichlid genera
Taxa named by George Albert Boulenger